Taylour Stevens (born August 31, 2000) is a Canadian curler from Chester, Nova Scotia. She currently skips her own team out of the Chester Curling Club. She is the skip of the current reigning Canadian Junior Championship rink, having won the 2022 Canadian Junior Curling Championships.

Career
Stevens was a member of the Cally Moore rink which represented Nova Scotia at the 2019 Canada Winter Games. They finished the round robin in fourth with a 6–4 record, qualifying them for the playoff round. They defeated Saskatchewan's Skyler Ackerman in the quarterfinals before being eliminated by eventual winners Ontario in the semifinal. They were able to pick up the bronze medal by defeating New Brunswick's Erica Cluff. This same team represented Nova Scotia later that year at the 2019 Canadian U18 Curling Championships but failed to advance to the knockout round after a 2–4 round robin record.

Stevens won the Nova Scotia Junior Women's Championship in 2020 skipping her own team with Lindsey Burgess, Kate Callaghan and Cate Fitzgerald. The team went undefeated throughout the tournament and defeated Stevens' former teammate Moore in the final. At nationals, Stevens skipped her team to an impressive 8–2 record throughout pool play, clinching them a playoff berth. Things wouldn't go their way in the semifinal however, losing to Alberta's Abby Marks in an extra end.

Lindsey Burgess aged out of juniors following the 2019–20 season, so the team brought on Lauren Ferguson as their new third for the abbreviated 2020–21 season. They only played in one event, finishing 1–2 at The Curling Store Cashspiel. Kate Callaghan then aged out of juniors and was replaced by Alison Umlah at the second position. The Stevens rink was chosen to represent Nova Scotia at the 2021 World Junior Qualification Event for the chance to represent Canada at the 2022 World Junior Curling Championships. Through the round robin, Stevens led Nova Scotia to a 4–1 record and then defeated Manitoba's Meghan Walter in the quarterfinal. They then lost to eventual champions Northern Ontario's Isabelle Ladouceur 6–3 in the semifinal. In December 2021, the team played in the 2022 Nova Scotia Scotties Tournament of Hearts where they finished in third place with a 4–3 record. Team Stevens was again chosen to represent Nova Scotia at the 2022 Canadian Junior Curling Championships following the cancellation of the provincial playdowns. There, Stevens led her team to an undefeated 8–0 round robin record to qualify for the playoffs. They then beat Alberta's Claire Booth in the semifinal to qualify for the final against Ontario's Emily Deschenes. Tied in the tenth end, Stevens made an open hit to secure the victory for her team 7–5. Because of her age, Stevens is ineligible to play as a junior during the 2022–23 season. Her team recruited Emily Deschenes, who they beat in the 2022 Canadian junior final, to replace Stevens as skip for the season. Stevens remained with the team in a support role and playing as alternate in womens events. The team represented Canada at the 2023 World Junior B Curling Championship in Lohja, Finland and went undefeated beating Scotland's Fay Henderson in the Final winning gold and qualifying for the 2023 World Junior Curling Championship in Fussen, Germany.

Personal life
Stevens is currently a commerce student at Saint Mary's University.

Teams

References

External links

Living people
2000 births
Canadian women curlers
Curlers from Nova Scotia
People from Lunenburg County, Nova Scotia
Saint Mary's University (Halifax) alumni